Aerolíneas de Guinea Ecuatorial was a cargo airline based in Malabo, Equatorial Guinea. It was established in 2003.

The company was closed in 2004 by order of the government and its Antonov aircraft was used to create Equatair.

Fleet 
The Aerolíneas de Guinea Ecuatorial fleet consisted of 
1 – Antonov An-24B aircraft (at January 2005)

See also		
 List of defunct airlines of Equatorial Guinea

References

Defunct airlines of Equatorial Guinea
Airlines established in 2003
Airlines disestablished in 2004
Defunct cargo airlines
Malabo
2003 establishments in Equatorial Guinea
2004 disestablishments in Africa